The Lives and Times of Jerry Cornelius is a collection of short stories by British fantasy and science fiction writer Michael Moorcock. It is part of his long-running Jerry Cornelius series. The book was originally published by Allison & Busby in 1976 and collects stories originally published between 1969 and 1974.
A later edition was published in 2003 by Four Walls Eight Windows, in which four stories from the original edition are replaced.

Contents

Allison & Busby edition, 1976
 "The Peking Junction"
 "The Delhi Division"
 "The Tank Trapeze"
 "The Nature of the Catastrophe"
 "The Swastika Set-Up"
 "The Sunset Perspective"
 "Sea Wolves"
 "Voortrekker"
 "Dead Singers"
 "The Longford Cup"
 "The Entropy Circuit"

Four Walls Eight Windows edition, 2003
 Introduction
 "The Peking Junction"
 "The Delhi Division"
 "The Tank Trapeze"
 "The Swastika Set-Up"
 "The Sunset Perspective"
 "Sea Wolves"
 "Voortrekker"
 "The Spencer Inheritance"
 "The Camus Connection"
 "Cheering for the Rockets"
 "Firing the Cathedral"

Reception
Dave Langford reviewed The Lives and Times of Jerry Cornelius for White Dwarf #88, and stated that "oblique, fragmented stories of the hero/assassin who became a rallying point for the 1960s 'New Wave' themes of entropy and disintegration".

References

External links

1976 short story collections
Allison and Busby books
Books by Michael Moorcock
Science fiction short story collections